"To Paris with Love" is the 89th released single from Donna Summer. It was produced by Peter Stengaard and co-written by Bruce Roberts and Summer. The single was Summer's sixteenth number one, and her final charting single to date, on the Billboard Hot Dance Club Play chart, where it reached number one in November 2010.

Charts

Weekly charts

Year-end charts

See also
List of number-one dance singles of 2010 (U.S.)

References

2010 singles
2010 songs
Donna Summer songs
Songs about Paris
Songs written by Donna Summer
Dance-pop songs
House music songs
Songs written by Bruce Roberts (singer)